Gunbus may refer to:

Aircraft
Burgess Gunbus, American biplane fighter
Sopwith Gunbus, British WWI seaplane
Vickers F.B.5 Gunbus, British WWI fighter

Other
Gunbus 410, German motorcycle
Gunbus (film), 1986 British film, also known as Sky Bandits